The Dózsa György Street Synagogue Budapest XIII. district synagogue. Originally used as a synagogue, the building is now used by the Budapest Honved Fencing Hall, and the religious building continues in a smaller building formerly used as a cultural hall under the religious guidance of Rabbi Peter Deutsch.

History 
The synagogue was built to serve the Jews of northern Pest after the failure of the Lipótvár synagogue's plan next to the then Arena (today: György Dózsa street) (Dózsa György út 55, 1134). The plot, opposite the former Jewish cemetery, was on the other side of the road and was purchased on February 27, 1907. Construction was started this year according to the plans of Lipót Baumhorn, and the synagogue was completed in 1909. Dr. Hevesi Simon and Wilheim Joachim inaugurated the house of worship.

At the end of the Second World War, during 1944-45, it was used as a collection camp, and after the fighting ended, it was once again a prayer house. However, by the end of the forties, the Jewish community, which had shrunk as a result of emigration, had used the synagogue as a storehouse in the former cultural hall.

The building was awarded to the Honvéd Budapest in 1984; after the renovation and rebuilding, its boxing and fencing department was established here.

The building 

The building of the synagogue consists of a central square in the middle, a foyer and a shrine. The central square is covered by a circular dome. Out of a total of 800 seats, 406 are on the ground floor and the other on the first floor. The interior walls were decorated with geometric motifs in yellow, blue, red and brown.

After the Honvéd took over the building, it was renovated and rebuilt internally. During the reconstruction carried out according to the plans of László Benczúr, two new slabs were installed, which provided three levels of training. During the design of the floor, the new elements could be demolished without damaging the old elements of the building. During the renovation, the old colors were used to decorate the interior, but only the geometric shapes, the original sacred symbols, were not restored.

Gallery

Sources

Video 
 Video about the synagogue

External links
Dózsa György Street Synagogue in the Bezalel Narkiss Index of Jewish Art, Center for Jewish Art, Hebrew University of Jerusalem

Synagogues in Budapest
Lipót Baumhorn buildings
Synagogues completed in 1909
13th District of Budapest
Former synagogues in Hungary